1,4-Cyclohexanedione is an organic compound with the formula (CH2)4(CO)2. This white solid is one of the three isomeric cyclohexanediones.  This particular diketone is used as a building block in the synthesis of more complex molecules.

Preparation
1,4-Cyclohexanedione is prepared in two steps from diesters of succinic acid.  Specifically under basic conditions, the diethyl ester condenses to give the cyclohexenediol derivative diethylsuccinoylsuccinate.  This intermediate can be hydrolysed and decarboxylated to afford the desired dione.

This dione condenses with malononitrile to give an intermediate that can be dehydrogenated to tetracyanoquinodimethane (TCNQ).

References

Diketones
Cyclohexanes